WKOI-TV (channel 43) is a television station licensed to Richmond, Indiana, United States, broadcasting the Ion Television network to the Dayton, Ohio area. The station is owned and operated by the Ion Media subsidiary of the E.W. Scripps Company. Transmission facilities are provided by unrelated NBC affiliate WDTN (channel 2), which shares its digital channel with WKOI-TV through a channel sharing agreement, along with WDTN's sister station, Springfield, Ohio–licensed CW affiliate WBDT (channel 26); the transmitter is located on Frytown Road in southwest Dayton. For the purposes of its FCC correspondence, WKOI's official 'studio' facility is located at Scripps Center in downtown Cincinnati (along with many other Ion stations).

History
WKOI-TV signed on May 11, 1982, as an independent station airing religious programming. In 1986, it was purchased by the Trinity Broadcasting Network (TBN). As a TBN O&O, the station cleared almost all of the network's programming, only breaking away from the network once a week for local community public affairs programming.

Until June 7, 2018, WKOI-TV's transmitter was located on SR 73 in Milford Township, Butler County, Ohio, near Collinsville, approximately halfway between Richmond and Cincinnati providing coverage to Northern Kentucky, Greater Cincinnati and the Miami Valley in Ohio, and East Central Indiana. Even though its transmitter was based within the Cincinnati television market, the station was officially assigned by Nielsen to the Dayton market.

TBN entered into an option agreement with Ion Media on November 14, 2017, which gave Ion the option to acquire the licenses of WKOI-TV and three other TBN stations that had sold their spectrum in the Federal Communications Commission (FCC)'s incentive auction; Ion exercised the option on May 24, 2018. The sale was completed on September 25, 2018.

Technical information

Subchannel

Analog-to-digital conversion
WKOI-TV (along with all other TBN-owned full-power stations) shut down its analog signal, over UHF channel 43, on April 16, 2009. The station's digital signal remained on its pre-transition UHF channel 39. Through the use of PSIP, digital television receivers display the station's virtual channel as its former UHF analog channel 43. The station's digital signal was multiplexed, carrying TBN on 43.1, The Church Channel on 43.2, JCTV on 43.3, Enlace on 43.4 and Smile of a Child on 43.5. Later, The Church Channel became Hillsong Channel, JCTV became JUCE TV and was combined on 43.3 with Smile, and TBN Salsa was added on 43.5.

Spectrum sale and channel sharing agreement
On April 14, 2017, it was reported that WKOI-TV's over-the-air spectrum had been sold in the FCC's spectrum reallocation auction, fetching just over $20 million, with the station expected to go off the air. On March 22, 2018, it was announced that WKOI-TV would share spectrum with unrelated NBC affiliate WDTN.

On June 7, 2018, WKOI-TV began sharing WDTN's digital channel, with all TBN channels dropped, and Ion Television programming appearing on virtual channel 43.1. WDTN also continued to carry Ion Television on virtual channel 2.3, as it had since February 1, 2018; on June 29, 2018, when WDTN's sister station WBDT also began sharing WDTN's digital signal, virtual channel 2.3 was dropped.

Former translators
WKOI-TV's programming was previously relayed on W20CL (channel 20) in Springfield, Ohio and W36DG (channel 36) in Cincinnati. A deal was reached to sell W20CL (now WLWD-LD in Dayton) to Word of God Fellowship, owner of the Daystar Television Network, on March 19, 2010; W36DG was also sold to Daystar, and is now WDYC-LD.

See also

Channel 31 digital TV stations in the United States
Channel 43 virtual TV stations in the United States
List of television stations in Ohio 
List of television stations in Ohio (by channel number)
List of television stations in the United States by call sign (initial letter W)

References

External links

Ion Television affiliates
E. W. Scripps Company television stations
Television channels and stations established in 1982
1982 establishments in Indiana
Richmond, Indiana
KOI-TV
KOI-TV